Jean-Louis-Félix Danjou (21 June 1812 – 4 March 1866) was a French organist, composer-arranger, and organist. He is best remembered for having discovered the Antiphonary of St. Benigne in 1847. and as founder of the Revue de la musique religieuse.

Career
Danjou was organist at Church of Notre-Dame-des-Blancs-Manteaux 1831–34, Saint-Eustache from 1834–1844, at Notre-Dame de Paris from 1840 to 1847. He was also a partner with André-Marie Daublaine and :fr:Louis Callinet, of the :fr:Callinet family, in the :fr:Daublaine-Callinet organ company.

References

1812 births
1866 deaths
19th-century French composers
19th-century French male musicians
Conservatoire de Paris alumni
French classical organists
French male organists
Musicians from Paris
Male classical organists
19th-century organists